Severe Tropical Cyclone Gabrielle was a severe tropical cyclone that devastated the North Island of New Zealand and affected parts of Vanuatu and Australia in February 2023. It is the costliest tropical cyclone on record in the Southern Hemisphere, with damages estimated to be at least NZ$13.5 billion (US$8.4 billion). It was also the deadliest cyclone and weather event overall to hit New Zealand since Cyclone Giselle in 1968, surpassing Cyclone Bola in 1988. The fifth named storm of the 2022–23 Australian region cyclone season, and the first severe tropical cyclone of the 2022–23 South Pacific cyclone season, Gabrielle was first noted as a developing tropical low on 6 February 2023, while it was located to the south of the Solomon Islands, before it was classified as a tropical cyclone and named Gabrielle by the Bureau of Meteorology. The system peaked as a Category 3 severe tropical cyclone before moving into the South Pacific basin, then rapidly degenerated into a subtropical low on 11 February 2023.

Norfolk Island was placed under a red alert as Gabrielle approached, while heavy rain and wind warnings were issued across the North Island of New Zealand. Existing states of emergency in Auckland and the Coromandel due to recent floods were extended, and new states of emergency were declared in other areas. The cyclone hit New Zealand from 12 to 16 February, with a national state of emergency being declared on 14 February 2023.

Meteorological history

During that day, the system passed near or over Rennell Island in the Solomon Islands as it moved westwards into the Australian region from the South Pacific basin. Over the next couple of days, the system gradually developed further as it moved south-westwards along a ridge of high pressure towards Queensland, Australia, before the United States Joint Typhoon Warning Center initiated advisories and classified it as Tropical Cyclone 12P during 8 February. At around the same time, the BoM reported that the tropical low had developed into a Category 1 tropical cyclone on the Australian tropical cyclone intensity scale and named it Gabrielle.

By 18:00 UTC on 9 February, the storm continued to intensify and soon became a Category 3 severe tropical cyclone. Gabrielle began to experience an increase in northwesterly vertical wind shear, the JTWC downgraded it to a Category 1-equivalent cyclone. On 10 February, Gabrielle moved into MetService's area of responsibility. The JTWC also discontinued warnings on the system around 21:00 UTC that day Gabrielle was downgraded to a Category 2 tropical cyclone by the MetService. During 11 February, after Gabrielle had passed directly over Norfolk Island, the BoM and MetService reported that Gabrielle had weakened into a deep subtropical low.

Effects

Melanesia 

In Vanuatu, Malpoi, a village in the northwest of Espiritu Santo, was severely affected by landslides, mud, and the destruction of houses and gardens. The water supply was also contaminated. As their plantations were damaged by the landslide, chairman Allan Taman of Vanuatu's Santo Sunset Environment Network stated that the villagers may require long-term financial assistance. Some villagers in the disaster-affected areas were also forced to evacuate. In New Caledonia, strong swell warnings were put in place for 16 districts; 14 boats were damaged and one sank due to wind and swells, leading to an evacuation plan for the damaged ships.

Norfolk Island
The Australian territory of Norfolk Island was placed under a red alert as Gabrielle approached, with the center of the storm forecast to pass over or close to the island. Australian military and emergency personnel were on standby and ready to respond. The Emergency Management Norfolk Island (EMNI) sent out a warning on Saturday afternoon, advising people to stay inside and announcing that most businesses would close.

On Norfolk Island, a red alert warning was issued before the cyclone. During 11 February, Gabrielle passed directly over Norfolk Island. Although the cyclone brought down trees and disrupted power, there were no reports of significant damage. Norfolk Island's emergency controller George Plant said there had been 40 calls for help, but the damage was "manageable".

New Zealand

Heavy rain and wind warnings were issued for across the North Island of New Zealand as Gabrielle approached the country, including red heavy rain warnings in Northland, Auckland, Coromandel, Gisborne District, and Hawke's Bay, and red wind warnings in Northland, Auckland, Coromandel Peninsula, and Taranaki. During 9 February, states of emergency in place in Auckland and the Coromandel Peninsula as a result of earlier floods were extended in anticipation of Gabrielle's arrival, while a precautionary state of emergency was declared in Northland on 12 February. Many residents across the upper North Island who had been affected by earlier flooding prepared themselves for the cyclone, while emergency services were on high alert. Residents were warned that power cuts were likely and it was suggested that people withdraw some cash because electronic payment systems would not work in a power cut. People were encouraged to have three days of supplies.

Air New Zealand cancelled many domestic and international flights as the cyclone approached, while Bluebridge and Interislander cancelled Cook Strait ferry crossings. The Ministry of Education advised Auckland schools to close, but the decision remained with individual boards of trustees. All schools in Taranaki were closed on 14 February. Prime Minister Chris Hipkins said citizens should take the severe weather warning seriously and make sure they were prepared. Some authorities compared the likely effect of Gabrielle with the effects of Cyclone Hola (2018) and the devastating Cyclone Bola (1988). The cyclone brought gale-force winds to the North Island. During 12 February, areas of the upper North Island began experiencing widespread power outages and property damage as the outer edges of the cyclone swept the country, with over 225,000 homes losing power as conditions worsened through 13 and 14 February. Severe flooding occurred, while some buildings had their roofs torn off in the wind or were damaged by landslides. Numerous roads across the North Island were closed due to flooding and high winds, including Auckland Harbour Bridge. Hundreds of people across the North Island were mandatorily evacuated, while hundreds more self-evacuated. An estimated 10,000 people were displaced as a result of the cyclone. 365 claims of injuries were accepted by ACC. On 23 February, there were 6960 reports of people uncontactable. Hundreds of police staff worked on locating those people and every person uncontactable was finally accounted for on 7 March.

Northland 
Extensive flooding occurred across the region, while multiple roads were closed, including SH 1 near the Brynderwyn Range which was closed for the third time in just over a month. Many people across the region lost electricity, phone service, and internet connections.

Auckland
The West Auckland communities of Piha, Karekare, Waimauku and Muriwai were heavily affected. Two firefighters died after being caught in a landslide in Muriwai. Two people went missing at sea near Great Barrier Island and Northland, but were both later found. 50 apartments were evacuated in Mount Eden on the evening of the 13th after engineers determined strong winds could cause the historic Colonial Ammunition Company Shot Tower to collapse. The tower was demolished a week later. 224 buildings were red stickered across the region, meaning entry is prohibited, 323 were yellow stickered, meaning access is restricted, while 977 were white stickered, meaning minor damage only. Of these, 130 red stickered homes were in the town of Muriwai; nearly a third of all the homes in the town. Of the 600,000 connection on the Vector network, 42,000 were without power on 14 Feb, and they are mostly fixed by Mar 3.

Gisborne District
A man was found dead at Te Karaka. The potable water supply to the Gisborne urban area was impacted with failures in the distribution system between the water treatment plant and the city. This prompted the use of Emergency Message alerts to residents to 'Stop using Water'. 9 buildings were red stickered across the region, while 149 were yellow stickered.
Roading networks were significantly affected with townships along State Highway 35 disconnected. SH35 remains closed between Tolaga Bay and Te Puia Springs due to the road being lost south of Te Puia and the Hikuwai Bridge washing out. Many local roads are closed, which further restricts access to communities.

Hawke's Bay

Stopbanks were overtopped by floodwater in Hawke's Bay, caused partly by the buildup of debris at structures such as bridges. Overtopping caused erosion of stopbanks, leading to thirty breaches of them, covering five kilometres. Power was cut to over 40,000 properties, almost 32,000 of them in and around Napier, when the main Redcliffe substation was damaged after the Tutaekuri River burst its banks, and phone and internet services were lost. Downstream, 1,000 people were evacuated from the low-lying Heretaunga Plains surrounding the river, where parts of Taradale, Meeanee, and Awatoto were submerged. 8,000 additional people were evacuated or self-evacuated across the region by nightfall. 83 buildings across the region were red stickered, while 991 were yellow stickered. Eight people were found dead.

A flash flood swept through the Esk Valley as the Esk River burst its banks, submerging properties under 7 metres of water and burying homes in silt up to their roof lines. One house was moved 600 metres from its original position. The Ngaruroro River burst its banks, flooding the small settlement of Omahu, where 20 people required evacuation by helicopter. Floodwaters washed away spans and piers of a rail bridge between Clive and Napier, and also damaged two other rail bridges just north of Hastings, and the one at Waipawa. They destroyed six road bridges on the Heretaunga Plains and in its hinterland: Brookfields Bridge over the Tūtaekurī at Pakowhai; Redclyffe Bridge, a major crossing of the Tūtaekurī from Taradale to Waiohiki; the Vicarage Road bridge over the Tūtaekurī at the settlement of Puketapu; Dartmoor Bridge over the Mangaone River, a tributary of the Tūtaekurī, between Puketapu and Dartmoor; the Rissington Bridge over the Mangaone in the Rissington area; and a bridge on Hawkston Road in the Patoka area. 

Between Napier and Wairoa, the State Highway 2 bridge over the Waikari River just north of Putorino was destroyed. The Wairoa River burst its banks, flooding 10 to 15 percent of Wairoa, containing about half the town's population. Access to Wairoa was cut off after extensive damage on SH2's Mohaka River Bridge in the south, and landslides to the north. A number of bridges in the Wairoa District were destroyed or damaged.

Water supply in Central Hawke's Bay failed, and a mandatory evacuation was ordered for eastern Waipawa after the Waipawa River rose to record levels. SH5 linking Napier with Taupo was closed indefinitely following major slips and infrastructure damage, as was SH2 north of Napier and the Napier–Taihape Road to the west. SH2 south linking Hastings with Tararua District was closed temporarily, opening to limited traffic capacity 4 days later.

Manawatū-Whanganui
Flooding occurred in Pohangina and Pohangina Valley East, while rivers such as the Rangitīkei, Manawatū and Ōroua flooded or rose, with some extending up to 500m across, and some roads were closed.

Marlborough

Aftermath

New Zealand

Prime Minister Hipkins announced on 13 February that the Government would provide NZ$11.5 million to support the community response to the cyclone. After the cyclone, the Government allocated a further NZ$50 million to support businesses and the primary sector, while NZ$250 million was allocated to assessing and fixing roads. Transpower declared a grid emergency on 14 February after Hawke's Bay and Gisborne District lost phone coverage, internet coverage, and electricity. In addition to the states of emergency in place in Auckland, Northland, and Thames-Coromandel, regional states of emergency were declared in Gisborne District, the Bay of Plenty, and Waikato Region on 13 February, with local states of emergency being declared in the Waikato, Hauraki, Whakatāne, and Ōpōtiki Districts. 

A regional state of emergency was declared in Hawke's Bay on 14 February, with local states of emergency being declared in the Napier, Hastings, and Tararua Districts, before a national state of emergency was declared for only the third time in New Zealand's history later in the day. Sittings of the House of Representatives were adjourned for a week. On 17 February, Australia sent a team of 25 impact assessment experts to aid with disaster relief in New Zealand at the request of the New Zealand Government.

By 19 February, Hipkins confirmed that 3,200 people were registered as uncontactable though he stated that the number was expected to drop. The official death toll rose to 11. Hipkins confirmed that 28,000 homes, mostly in Napier and Hastings, had no power. Police arrested 42 people in Hawke's Bay and 17 in Gisborne for looting and dishonesty offences. The National Emergency Management Agency deployed 60 Starlink Internet devices while the Royal New Zealand Navy dispatched the HMNZS Canterbury with supplies and equipment to build temporary bridges. The Royal Australian Air Force deployed a C-130 Hercules as part of the international relief effort. The New Zealand Government accepted an offer of help from Fiji.

On 23 February, the New Zealand Police said they had conducted 507 prevention activities in the North Island's Eastern District on 22 February including reassurance patrols. During that time, they received 597 calls from the public including six burglary reports, 11 unlawful takings, and 38 family harm incidents. Police said they had arrested 35 people (24 in Hawke's Bay and 11 in Gisborne) for various offences including car conversion, serious assaults, burglary, and disorder. By 23 February, the number of uncontacteable people was 152. The police deployed 145 additional staff and an Eagle helicopter to the Eastern District. More flooding later occurred in Auckland and Northland on 24 February as rain storms struck the North Island, and weather warnings were issued for Coromandel Peninsula, Auckland and Northland.

On 23 February, the Government ordered a ministerial inquiry into forestry companies' slash practices, which had exacerbated flood damage caused by Cyclone Gabrielle. The forestry industry's practice of stockpiling of discarded branches and "offcuts" had damaged buildings and land during the flooding. The inquiry will be led by former National Party cabinet minister Hekia Parata, former Hawke's Bay Regional Council chief executive Bill Bayfield, and forestry engineer Matthew McCloy. Several political and civil society leaders including National Party leader Luxon, the Forest Owners Association President Don Carson, Green Party co-leader Shaw and fellow Green MP Eugenie Sage, and Forestry Minister Stuart Nash supported calls for an inquiry into the forestry industry's practices and accountability for flood damage from forestry companies.

On 27 February, the state of emergency for Bay of Plenty was lifted while others were renewed for another 7 days. A special Lotto draw will be held on March 18 with 50% of receipts going to cyclone relief. The 2023 New Zealand census scheduled for will not be postponed but field collectors will work for an extra 8 weeks in the cyclone affected areas in order to reach more people.

Cyclone Gabrielle along with the 2023 North Island floods has renewed national discussion around managed retreat, the concept of moving people, assets and activities from dangerous locations. A range of figures and groups including the "West Auckland is Flooding" advocacy group, Victoria University of Wellington public policy emeritus professor Dr Jonathan Boston, former cabinet minister Phil Twyford, and University of Waikato environmental planning lecturer Dr Christina Hanna have advocated that the New Zealand Government and local councils encourage and subsidise residents and businesses to evacuate from flood-prone areas in New Zealand including West Auckland, Westport, South Dunedin, Christchurch's Southshore suburb, Lower Hutt's Petone suburb, and parts of Whakatāne, Whanganui or Whangārei. In February 2023, Prime Minister Hipkins and Climate Change Minister James Shaw confirmed that the Government was incorporating managed retreat into its Climate Change Adaptation Bill and disaster response policies.

In early March 2023, Destiny Church leader Brian Tamaki blamed pornography, abortion, and gay rights for causing Cyclone Gabrielle during an hour long sermon based on the Old Testament Book of Leviticus. He also claimed that Gisborne and Hastings had the highest number of pornography consumers in New Zealand. Tamaki's remarks were condemned by Mayor of Gisborne Rehette Stoltz, who described them as "disappointing, unhelpful and laughable" during a time when members of the community had lost their homes and livelihoods.

See also

Tropical cyclones in 2023
Weather of 2023
List of natural disasters in New Zealand
List of disasters in New Zealand by death toll
2023 North Island floods
Cyclone Bola (1988)
Cyclone Ita (2014)
Cyclone Dovi (2022)

References

External links

2023 meteorology
2023 in Norfolk Island
February 2023 events in New Zealand
2023 in the Solomon Islands
2023 in Vanuatu
2022–23 South Pacific cyclone season
2022–23 Australian region cyclone season
Tropical cyclones in 2023
Tropical cyclones in New Zealand
Tropical cyclones in Norfolk Island
Category 3 South Pacific cyclones
Category 3 Australian region cyclones
Tropical cyclones in the Solomon Islands
Tropical cyclones in Vanuatu